Smoke Signals is a 1998 coming-of-age comedy-drama film directed by Chris Eyre from a screenplay by Sherman Alexie, based on Alexie's short story collection The Lone Ranger and Tonto Fistfight in Heaven (1993). The film won several awards and accolades, and was well received at numerous film festivals.

In 2018, the film was selected by the Library of Congress for preservation in the United States National Film Registry for being "culturally, historically, or aesthetically significant."

Plot
Victor Joseph and Thomas Builds-the-Fire live on the Coeur d'Alene Indian Reservation in Plummer, Idaho. Thomas is an eccentric storyteller and Victor is an angry young man who enjoys playing basketball.

Victor and Thomas are brought together through Victor's father, Arnold. Arnold rescued Thomas as an infant from a house fire that killed his parents in 1976. Because of this, Thomas considers him a hero. On the other hand, Victor, who endures Arnold's alcoholism, domestic violence, and eventual child abandonment, regards his father with both deep love and bitter resentment. Thomas and Victor grow up together as neighbors and acquaintances, fighting with each other and simultaneously forming a close, albeit uneasy, friendship.

When Arnold dies in Phoenix, Arizona, where he has stayed after leaving Victor and his mother Arlene, Victor and Thomas go on an adventure to retrieve his ashes. The trip is the means for Victor and Thomas to explore their identities. Neither of them loses sight of his identity as an "Indian", but their perspectives differ. Victor is more stoic and Thomas is more traditional (and romantic to the point of watching the feature film Dances with Wolves countless times). Their dichotomy is portrayed all through the film; it results in Victor being irritated with Thomas, and Thomas being fascinated with Victor.

Once they reach Phoenix, Victor has to confront his conflicted feelings about his father, as well as his own identity. He has to grapple with a new account of Thomas's parents' death, as told by his father's friend, Suzy Song. She says that a drunken Arnold set off fireworks, accidentally starting the fire that cost Thomas his parents. The road trip by the young men leads to Thomas reconciling with the memory of his adoptive father Arnold, as he understands more of his path to alcoholism and related abuse and abandonment. Victor also gains a better understanding of Thomas and his reverence for Arnold. Victor and Thomas eventually throw Arnold's ashes into a river as a form of acceptance.

Cast

Production
While it was not the first film created by native filmmakers in the United States, Smoke Signals is recognized as being the first feature-length film written, directed, and produced by Native Americans to reach a wide audience both in the US and abroad. This film is also notable for its authenticity with regard to its cast of Native American actors and actresses, and because it was filmed on location on the Coeur d'Alene Indian Reservation in Idaho.

Reception

Critical response
Smoke Signals was well received by mainstream critics. On Rotten Tomatoes, the film holds an approval rating of 81% based on 32 reviews, with an average rating of 7.2/10. The website's critics consensus reads: "Smoke Signals tells a familiar story from an underrepresented point of view, proving that a fresh perspective can help subvert long-established expectations." On Metacritic, the film has a weighted average score of 76 out of 100, based on 17 critics, indicating "generally favorable reviews".

Peter Stack of the San Francisco Chronicle gave the film a rave review, calling it, "unpretentious, funny and soulful ... Well-acted, well-written, with spare, beautiful imagery." Kevin Thomas of the Los Angeles Times described Smoke Signals as "a warm film of friendship and reconciliation, and whenever it refers to historic injustices or contemporary issues in Native American culture, it does so with wry, glancing humor. Smoke Signals is indeed poignant, but above all it's pretty funny." Marc Savlov of The Austin Chronicle called the film "poignant and slyly humorous" and "alight with oddball nuances and wry observations," saying further, "the cast is uniformly excellent in their roles, and Eyre's persistent use of long, trailing shots reinforces the story's elegiac tone. Simple and elegant, Smoke Signals is a delicious, heady debut that lingers long after the tale is told."

Susan Tavernetti of the Palo Alto Weekly, gave the film a mixed review, saying that "although sometimes the attempt to break down stereotypes seems stilted and forced, more often the result is humorous." She also said, "Chris Eyre's direction establishes an uneven tone, allowing some actors to deliver performances bordering on broad caricature while others play their roles straight." She praised the opening and closing sequences which "beautifully combine poetic voice-overs with visual lyricism."

Accolades
 1998 – American Indian Film Festival: Best film
 1998 – Christopher Award
 1998 – First Americans in the Arts: Outstanding Achievement in Writing (Sherman Alexie), Outstanding Performance by an Actor in a Film (Evan Adams), Outstanding Achievement in Directing (Chris Eyre)
 1998 – Gotham Awards: Nominations: Open Palm Award
 1998 – National Board of Review: Special Recognition For Excellence In Filmmaking
 1998 – San Diego World Film Festival: Best American Independent Feature; Best Screenplay (Sherman Alexie); Best Actor (Adam Beach); Best Director (Chris Eyre)
 1998 – Sundance Film Festival: Filmmaker's Trophy (Chris Eyre); Audience Award. Nominations: Grand Jury Prize
 1998 – Taos Talking Picture Festival: Taos Land Grant Award (Chris Eyre)
 1998 – Tokyo International Film Festival: Best Artistic Contribution (Chris Eyre) (tie)
 1999 – Florida Film Critics Circle Awards: Best Newcomer (Chris Eyre/Sherman Alexie)
 1999 – Independent Spirit Awards: Best Debut Performance (Evan Adams). Nominations: Best Supporting Male nomination (Gary Farmer), Best First Screenplay nomination (Sherman Alexie)
 1999 – Young Artist Awards: Nominations: Best Performance in a Feature Film-Supporting Young Actor (Cody Lightning)
 2018 – National Film Registry

See also
 Powwow Highway

References

Further reading

External links

 

1998 films
1998 comedy-drama films
1998 directorial debut films
1998 independent films
1990s American films
1990s buddy comedy-drama films
1990s coming-of-age comedy-drama films
1990s English-language films
1990s road comedy-drama films
American buddy comedy-drama films
American coming-of-age comedy-drama films
American independent films
American road comedy-drama films
Canadian coming-of-age comedy-drama films
Canadian independent films
Canadian road comedy-drama films
Films about Native Americans
Films based on short fiction
Films directed by Chris Eyre
Films set in Idaho
Films set in Phoenix, Arizona
Films set in Washington (state)
Films shot in Idaho
Miramax films
United States National Film Registry films
Works by Sherman Alexie